The Sawyer Kill or Sawyer's Kill is a  tributary stream of the Hudson River in New York state. The source is at the Great Vlaie on the border of Ulster and Greene counties.  The stream enters the Hudson River at Seamon Park in Malden, New York, just north of the village of Saugerties.

Saugerties takes its name from the Dutch, "Saugerje's Kill" or "Little Sawyer's creek".

See also
List of rivers of New York

References 

Rivers of New York (state)
Tributaries of the Hudson River
Rivers of Ulster County, New York